GALAS LGBTQ+ Armenian Society (formerly Gay and Lesbian Armenian Society) is one of the first LGBTQIA+ rights non-governmental organizations founded by Armenian Americans. GALAS was founded in 1998 and is headquartered in West Hollywood, California. Its mission is to serve and support the needs of lesbian, gay, bisexual, transgender and queer individuals of Armenian descent, to promote their human rights protection, and to advocate for the change of public policy around LGBTQ+ issues.

Organization
GALAS is a 501(c)(3) non-profit organization. GALAS runs various programs and provides a wide range of services to members of the LGBT community, including emergency response, mental health resources, cultural events, and educational resources.

Leadership
As of 2023, GALAS' Board of Directors, which is the governing body for the organization, includes:

 Erik Adamian
 Shant Jaltorossian
 Natalia Sookias
 Marina

History

1990s 
In 1998, GALAS was founded in Los Angeles County, California.

2000s 
In 2001, members of GALAS joined members of Q-Hye in San Francisco to form the first Armenian contingency ever to march in the San Francisco Pride parade. In total, 25 members of both organizations carried banners and Armenian flags down Market Street.

In 2002, GALAS participated for the first time in Los Angeles Pride, where the organization hosted an information booth featuring Armenian music, pictures, and maps of Armenia. Volunteers handed out informative brochures about GALAS, Armenian history, and gay Armenian life.

In 2007, following the assassination of journalist Hrant Dink in Istanbul, GALAS hosted a panel discussion featuring reexamining the social and political environment in Turkey. Participants included Armenian National Committee of America Community Relations Director Haig Hovsepian. During the question and answer session, the audience discussed their concerns regarding Armenian Genocide recognition.

In 2008, Herbert Hoover High School in Glendale, California planned a Day of Silence commemoration to recognize how LGBT+ youth have been "silenced" by harassment and bullying in schools. In response to an ensuing local campaign to keep children out of school on that day, Haig Boyadjian, then the President of GALAS, wrote a letter to the editor of the Glendale News-Press, stating 

In 2009, GALAS hosted a conference at West Hollywood's Plummer Park, entitled "The Road to Equality: The Past, Present and Future of the Gay Rights Movement," which concentrated on the aftermath of California Proposition 8 — which banned same-sex marriage in California — and ongoing cases in the California Supreme Court. The guest panel included attorneys from Lambda Legal, representatives from the Los Angeles LGBT Center, and managers of Vote for Equality Campaign, who discussed the various aspects of Proposition 8, including social, cultural and legal. The success of Proposition 8 was contrasted with the failure of the 1976 Briggs Initiative, which sought to ban gays and lesbians from working in California's public schools. Also discussed was GALAS' future, and its role in protecting LGBT+ civil rights.

2010s 
In 2010, GALAS again held a conference at Plummer Park, this time entitled "Breaking Through: Legally, Politically, Culturally." Speakers from Lambda Legal and Equality California discussed the current status of efforts to overturn Proposition 8, SB 906 (Civil Marriage Religious Freedom Act).

The Armenian National Committee of America's Raffi Hamparian stated:

In 2010, GALAS raised over $5,000 for AIDS Walk, benefitting APLA Health, an AIDS service organization dedicated to improving lives of people affected by HIV, reducing HIV infection and advocating for fair and effective HIV-related public policy.

During the early morning hours on 8 May 2012, Yerevan LGBT+ bar DIY was fire-bombed. On 15 May, a second attack occurred. GALAS responded shortly thereafter, stating 

In 2017, Los Angeles Pride replaced its traditional parade festivities with a protest against then-President Donald Trump's anti-LGBTQ+ policies. GALAS participated, declaring "We must rise together and be heard loud and clear - we will resist, we will win." This multi-ethnic and multi-religious coalition included organizations such as API Equality, Bienestar, Equality California, It Gets Better Project, JQ International, the Los Angeles LGBT Center, PFLAG, Satrang, Somos Familia Valle, and The Trevor Project.

GALAS denounced Fresno Unified School District President Brooke Ashjian's 2017 comments regarding the LGBTQ+ education requirements of the Healthy Young Act, which equated the LGBTQ+ community to the Ottoman perpetrators of the Armenian Genocide. Also in 2017, GALAS authored an op-ed applauding Arpa International Film Festival’s screening of the films "Listen to Me: Untold Stories Beyond Hatred" and "Apricot Groves" after the two films, which contain LGBT+ themes, were slashed from the 2017 program for the Golden Apricot Yerevan International Film Festival.

In 2018, GALAS celebrated its twentieth anniversary at a gala hosted by comedians Lory Tatoulian, Mary Basmadjian, and Movses Shakarian. For GALAS, 2018 marked a renewed pledge to building bridges between GALAS and other LGBTQ+ and Armenian community organizations, and the organization considered the creation of affiliate chapters to raise awareness in both Armenia and across the Armenian diaspora. Among those honored at the event were comedian James Adomian and Mamikon Hovsepyan, executive director of Pink Armenia, an organization with which GALAS has closely partnered. Performances included Element Band, known for their distinctive musical arrangements that preserve and popularize traditional Armenian songs.

Following the August 2018 attack on nine LGBT+ activists at a private home in the Armenian town of Shurnukh, Haig Boyadjian, then the President of GALAS, stated: "The Armenian government must once and for all take immediate steps to address the recent epidemic of violence targeting its LGBTQ citizens. We are deeply alarmed with the mysterious closing of criminal case regarding the violent attacks against 9 LGBTQ individuals last summer in the village of Shurnukh. The lack of action essentially condones and justifies future hate crimes against Armenia’s LGBTQ community. We are patiently waiting for Prime Minister Nikol Pashinyan to defend LGBTQ rights in the ‘New Armenia’ being forged and hope these senseless violent attacks will cease or at least be met with consequences under the law." GALAS joined over 100 Armenian organizations and prominent individuals in issuing a public letter to the Armenian government as well as Armenian political parties, international organizations and churches calling on them to condemn the attack and to promote legislative and policy changes to grant equality and end discrimination against LGBT persons in Armenia.

In November 2018, GALAS and the Glendale Library, Arts & Culture Department co-sponsored "Beyond Borders: Queer Pop-up Cafe," a moderated roundtable discussion intended to uncover common ground among various LGBTQ+ communities.

In response to several hate incidents targeting Armenian and Jewish institutions in the San Fernando Valley in early 2019, GALAS attended a meeting, hosted by California Assemblymembers Adrin Nazarian and Jesse Gabriel,  of religious and lay leaders from the Armenian and Jewish communities for an inter-community dialogue. The discussion focused on efforts to combat hate and discrimination of all forms.

2020s 

In the aftermath of the Second Nagorno-Karabakh War, GALAS was invited to speak at the November 2020 launch of Kamee Abrahamian, Nancy Baker Cahill, Mashinka Firunts Hakopian, and Nelli Sargsyan's "Monument to the Autonomous Republic of Artsakh," an augmented reality monument geolocated at the intersection of Artsakh Avenue and East Broadway in Glendale, California.

In March 2022, YWCA Glendale and Pasadena, glendaleOUT and Glendale Unified School District social sciences teacher Patrick Davarhanian hosted a digital panel entitled "Improving Allyship For Armenian LGBTQIA+ Communities". Panelists included Yerevan State University professor Vahan Bournazian; Pink Armenia director Mamikon Hovsepyan; Right Side NGO founder Lilit Martirosyan; Charachchi member Perch Melikyan; and Erik Adamian of GALAS, ONE Archives Foundation and Charachchi. Panelists relayed observations on human rights violations of LGBTQIA+ community members in Armenia, as depicted in the 2016 documentary "Listen to Me: Untold Stories Beyond Hatred". Panelists also highlighted responses from youth and advocates and presented a call to action to improve allyship for LGBTQIA+ youth and adults in both Armenia and the United States.

In a June 2022 Pride Month article in the Armenian Weekly, GALAS President Erik Adamian stated that "The humans of GALAS affirm and accept each other, amidst hatred and division. We recognize that our journeys are also bigger than one person. When one of us is able to show up in the world authentic in our multiple identities, that makes it possible for others like us to do the same. The organization continues to provide invaluable tools for queer Armenians to invest in their own paths toward dignity and self-actualization."

In January 2023, GALAS co-sponsored the Glendale Peace Walk, a Martin Luther King Jr. Day event. The event gathered a coalition of local organizations dedicated to equality, including Black in Glendale, glendaleOUT, the Glendale Environmental Coalition, the Glendale Teachers Association, and the Glendale Tenants Union.

In March 2023, GALAS hosted Right Side NGO founder Lilit Martirosyan in Glendale for a public discussion on the situation of LGBTQ+ people in Armenia, discrimination and human rights violations, and how supporters living in the United States can support LGBTQ+ people living in Armenia.

Programs and services

Outreach
GALAS strives to connect with communities to learn their needs, and to collaborate on supportive programming for LGBTQ+ Armenians.

Safe spaces
GALAS hosts safe spaces for discussion and understanding amongst LGBTQ+ Armenians and their communities.

Soorj Session 
Since 2018, GALAS has hosted its ongoing "Soorj Session" events, which are guided roundtable conversations between LGBTQ+ Armenians, their parents, families and friends to explore understanding and acceptance of LGBTQ+ identities and individuals. These conversations are facilitated by mental health and social work professionals through the sharing of coffee. Due to significant demand, Soorj Sessions are now a regular GALAS program, held every other month. While the event was initially envisioned as youth-focused, organizers soon realized that parents and allies were also in need of the program.

Educational resources
GALAS educates the community about LGBTQ+ issues for advancement and safety through presentation, collaborations, and expertise.

Leadership development
GALAS provides annual scholarships for LGBTQ+ Armenian and opportunities to for leadership advancement.

Scholarships 
For nearly all of the organization's history, GALAS has offered academic scholarships to undergraduate and graduate students.

Culture 
GALAS hosts cultural events to celebrate Armenian heritage and to engage with the greater Armenian community.

Art shows 
In 2018, GALAS, Abril Books, the Roslin Art Gallery, and ACE/121 Gallery collaborated to organize a series of LGBTQ-themed events, including an art show entitled "The Many Faces of Armenians: A Celebration of Queer-Armenian Art," in Glendale, California. Among the nearly 20 participating artists, most were Los Angeles-based. Their mixed-media work incorporated Armenian history and iconic symbols — such as the Armenian Genocide, Mount Ararat, and pomegranates — confronting duality of two cultures, but of being a gay immigrant, a minority within a minority. GALAS Boardmember Lousine Shamamian was quoted as saying "For GALAS to be celebrating LGBTQ pride in Glendale — the heart of the Armenian diaspora — is a profound marker of the progress the LGBTQ Armenian community has made."

Film screenings 
In 2016, GALAS held a sold-out screening of the Armenian Genocide film The Promise at the Cinerama Dome on its opening night.

Also in 2016, GALAS partnered with the Armenian Youth Federation to host a screening of "Listen to Me: Untold Stories Beyond Hatred," a documentary about Armenia's LGBT+ community. The screening served as a part of the official launch of the Armenian Youth Federation's United Human Rights Council's "Project Ser," a campaign to raise awareness about gender issues, sexuality, and LGBT issues.

Queernissage 
Since 2021, GALAS has hosted Queernissage, a yearly open-air market inspired by Yerevan's Vernissage market, and featuring LGBTQ+ creatives of Southwest Asian and North African (SWANA) descent. Through this event, GALAS aims to create a space for its community members to express and share their creativity with each other and with the public.

At the 2021 event, then-Boardmember Lousine Shamamian was quoted as saying "One of the things that I noticed with all of the general action that was happening around Artsakh was that a lot of LGBTQ Armenians were actively engaging with the broader Armenian community. Prior to that, there was a separation of Armenian queer folks…they didn’t feel a sense of belonging to the bigger community.” A number of the vendors at the event began making their items as fundraisers for relief efforts in Artsakh.

Armenian digital media platform Miaseen featured the 2021 event in a series of videos named "Queernissage Profiles," which featured vendors at the event.

Items for sale at the 2022 event included spices, jewelry, pottery, posters, books, and even food. Among the attendees was Glendale mayor Ardy Kassakhian, who stated "If someone’s going to threaten this group of people, I’m going stand there with them and make sure I’m there and present and show myself as a mayor of a large Armenian community — saying that I am here to serve every Armenian."

Partnerships with other organizations

Recognition and impact
In May 2022, the City of Glendale issued a Pride Month proclamation honoring GALAS and glendaleOUT.

At an October 2022 fundraiser brunch hosted by California State Assemblymember Adrin Nazarian, the organization and its members received awards and recognition from local elected officials, including Los Angeles County Supervisors Kathryn Barger and Hilda Solis, and Los Angeles City Councilmember Paul Krekorian.

See also

LGBT rights in Armenia
LGBT rights in the United States
List of LGBT rights organizations in the United States
History of Armenian Americans in Los Angeles
Human rights in Armenia
Recognition of same-sex unions in Armenia
Social issues in Armenia

References

External links
GALAS LGBTQ+ Armenian Society official website

LGBT culture in Los Angeles
LGBT history in California
LGBT political advocacy groups in California
Armenian-American culture in California
Armenian-American culture in Los Angeles
Non-profit organizations based in California
Non-profit organizations based in Los Angeles
LGBT rights in California
LGBT political advocacy groups in the United States
Immigrant rights organizations in the United States
Human rights organizations based in the United States
LGBT history in the United States
History of LGBT civil rights in the United States
International LGBT organizations
Organizations that support LGBT people
LGBT rights in Armenia
LGBT in Armenia
1998 in LGBT history
1998 establishments in California
Organizations established in 1998
501(c)(3) organizations